Mountain View High School  is a four-year public secondary school, located in Meridian, Idaho. Opened  in the fall of 2003, it is the fourth of six traditional high schools in the West Ada School District (#2) and serves its southern portion. The school colors are Navy Blue, Kelly Green, and White, and the mascot is the maverick.

Athletics
Mountain View competes in the IHSAA Class 5A, for the largest schools in the state, and is a member of the Southern Idaho Conference (5A) (SIC). In 2012, Mountain View had the largest enrollment in the state, followed by neighboring Rocky Mountain.

The Stinky Sneaker
The Stinky Sneaker- a rivalry basketball game between MVHS and Meridian High school. The biggest high school sporting event in the state of Idaho. Its a spirit competition with 3 categories for the judges; Spirit, sportsmanship, and decorations...

Wins 
2006
2007
2008
2009
2010
2011
2023: Leads- Hayden Tueller and Claire Hill

State titles

Boys
 Cross Country (3): fall 2006, 2014, 2015 
 Football (1): fall 2016
 Soccer (1) fall 2006  
 Basketball (1): 2011 
 Wrestling (1): 2008 
 Lacrosse (1) : 2013
 Rugby (2): 2014, 2016  
 Baseball (1): 2019 

Girls
 Basketball (3): 2015, 2016, 2020
 Cross Country (2): fall 2008, 2010  
 Track (2): 2011, 2012

References

External links

 West Ada School District #2

Public high schools in Idaho
Schools in Ada County, Idaho
Treasure Valley
Educational institutions established in 2003
Meridian, Idaho
2003 establishments in Idaho
West Ada School District (Idaho)